The Ottoman Turks, were a Turkic ethnic group. They founded the Ottoman Empire in the Early Modern Era and remained sociopolitically the most dominant group in the Empire for the duration ( 1299/1302–1922).

Reliable information about the early history of Ottoman Turks remains scarce, but they take their Turkish name, Osmanlı ("Osman" became altered in some European languages as "Ottoman"), from the house of Osman I (reigned  1299–1326), the founder of the House of Osman, the ruling dynasty of the Ottoman Empire for its entire 624 years. Expanding from its base in Söğüt, the Ottoman principality began incorporating other Turkish-speaking Muslims and non-Turkish Christians. Crossing into Europe from the 1350s, coming to dominate the Mediterranean Sea and, in 1453, invading Constantinople (the capital city of the Byzantine Empire), the Ottoman Turks blocked  all major land routes between Asia and Europe. Western Europeans had to find other ways to trade with the East.

Brief history 

The "Ottomans" first became known to the West in the 13th century when they migrated from their homeland in Central Asia westward to the Seljuk Sultanate of Rum in Anatolia. Ertugrul, leader of the nomadic Kayı tribe, first established a principality as part of the decaying Seljuk empire. His son Osman expanded the principality; the polity and the people were named "Ottomans" by Europeans after him ("Ottoman" being a corruption of "Osman"). Osman's son Orhan expanded the growing realm into an empire, taking Nicaea (present-day İznik) and crossed the Dardanelles in 1362. All coins unearthed in  during the two centuries before Orhan bear the names of Illkhanate rulers. The Seljuks were under the suzerainty of the Illkhanates and later the Turco-Mongol Timur lane. 
The Ottoman Empire came into its own when Mehmed II captured the reduced Byzantine Empire's well-defended capital, Constantinople in 1453.

The Ottoman Empire came to rule much of the Balkans, the Caucasus, the Middle East (excluding Iran), and North Africa over the course of several centuries, with an advanced army and navy. The Empire lasted until the end of the First World War, when it was defeated by the Allies and partitioned. Following the successful Turkish War of Independence that ended with the Turkish national movement retaking most of the land lost to the Allies, the movement abolished the Ottoman sultanate on November 1, 1922, and proclaimed the Republic of Turkey on October 29, 1923. The movement nullified the Treaty of Sèvres and negotiated the significantly more favorable Treaty of Lausanne (1923), assuring recognition of modern Turkish national borders, termed Misak-ı Milli (National Pact).

Not all Ottomans were Muslims and not all Ottoman Muslims were Turks, but starting from 1924, every citizen of the newly found Turkish Republic became considered as "Turk". Article 88 of 1924 Constitution, which was based on the 1921 Constitution, states that the name Turk, as a political term, shall be understood to include all citizens of the Turkish Republic, without distinction of, or reference to race or religion.

Culture and arts

The conquest of Constantinople began to make the Ottomans the rulers of one of the most profitable empires, connected to the flourishing Islamic cultures of the time, and at the crossroads of trade into Europe. The Ottomans made major developments in calligraphy, writing, law, architecture, and military science, and became the standard of opulence.

Calligraphy
Because Islam is a monotheistic religion that focuses heavily on learning the central text of the Quran and Islamic culture has historically tended towards discouraging or prohibiting figurative art, calligraphy became one of the foremost of the arts. 

The early Yâkût period was supplanted in the late 15th century by a new style pioneered by Şeyh Hamdullah (1429–1520), which became the basis for Ottoman calligraphy, focusing on the Nesih version of the script, which became the standard for copying the Quran (see Islamic calligraphy).

The next great change in Ottoman calligraphy came from the style of Hâfiz Osman (1642–1698), whose rigorous and simplified style found favour with an empire at its peak of territorial extent and governmental burdens. 

The late calligraphic style of the Ottomans was created by Mustafa Râkim (1757–1826) as an extension and reform of Osman's style, placing greater emphasis on technical perfection, which broadened the calligraphic art to encompass the sülüs script as well as the Nesih script.

Poetry

Ottoman poetry included epic-length verse but is better known for shorter forms such as the gazel. For example, the epic poet Ahmedi (-1412) is remembered for his Alexander the Great. His contemporary Sheykhi wrote verses on love and romance. Yaziji-Oglu produced a religious epic on Mohammed's life, drawing from the stylistic advances of the previous generation and Ahmedi's epic forms.

Painting

By the 14th century, the Ottoman Empire's prosperity made manuscript works available to merchants and craftsmen, and produced a flowering of miniatures that depicted pageantry, daily life, commerce, cities and stories, and chronicled events. 

By the late 18th century, European influences in painting were clear, with the introduction of oils, perspective, figurative paintings, use of anatomy and composition.

See also
Turkish people
Ottoman Greeks
Ottoman Armenians

References

Citations

Sources 

 Primary sources

External links 

BBC website